The Point Barrow Refuge Station is a historic building in the Browerville section of Utqiaġvik, Alaska (formerly Barrow).  Built in 1889, it is the oldest wood-frame building in Utqiaġvik.  Its main portion is a rectangular structure with a steeply-pitched gable roof, to which a number of additions have been made.  One early addition was a shed-roof section, with the capacity to hold 20 tons of coal; this structure later became the main room of Brower's Cafe.  The building is now finished in weatherboard, but was original sheathed in vertical planking.

The building was originally erected to house a rescue and support station for whaling ships, but served in this role only until 1896.  It was adapted for use as the Captain Smythe Whaling and Trading Company, a retail establishment, and most recently housed Brower's Cafe.

The building was listed on the National Register of Historic Places in 1980.

See also
National Register of Historic Places listings in North Slope Borough, Alaska

References

Commercial buildings on the National Register of Historic Places in Alaska
Buildings and structures completed in 1889
Buildings and structures in North Slope Borough, Alaska
Buildings and structures on the National Register of Historic Places in North Slope Borough, Alaska
Utqiagvik, Alaska